Garbe, Lahmeyer & Co. (until 1938 also known as: DEW - Deutsche Elektrizitäts-Werke zu Aachen) is a former electrical engineering company in Aachen.

The company was founded in 1886 by Wilhelm Lahmeyer in Aachen as Deutsche Elektrizitäts-Werke zu Aachen, Garbe, Lahmeyer & Co.. Lahmeyer left the company only a few years later, but the company still used his name. From 1938 the company was known as Garbe, Lahmeyer & Co. (GL).

GL produced all sorts of electric motors, electric generators, alternators, starters, motor–generator, and other electrical equipment. They were also one of the suppliers of electric motors for Type VIIC U-boats.

In 1973 GL was taken over by  CGEE Alsthom.

Production under the GL label stopped around 1993.

References

General
 Garbe, Lahmeyer & Co. (HRSG): Das Buch der Garbe, Lahmeyer und Co. AG., Aachener Verlags-Druckerei Gesellschaft, Jahr o.A, 288 Seiten

 Heinz Steguweit: Licht und Kraft. 1. April 1886 - 1. April 1961. Zum 75jährigen Bestehen der Firma Garbe, Lahmeyer & Co. Aktiengesellschaft. Firmenschrift, Aachen. EA, als Manuskript gedruckt, 1961
Specific

 

Electrical engineering companies of Germany
Electronics companies established in 1886
Defunct manufacturing companies of Germany
Manufacturing companies based in Aachen
1973 mergers and acquisitions
Electronics companies disestablished in 1993
German companies disestablished in 1993
German companies established in 1886